Kozhemyaka (meaning a leather worker, tanner) is a gender-neutral Russian surname. It may refer to
Nikita the Tanner (Nikita Kozhemyaka), East Slavic folk hero
Stepan Kozhumyaka (1898–1989), Ukrainian engineer, bridge-builder and linguist

See also
Kozhemyakin, derivative surname

Russian-language surnames
Occupational surnames